The Canary Wharf Squash Classic 2012 is the 2012's Canary Wharf Squash Classic, which is a tournament of the PSA World Tour event International (Prize money : 50 000 $). The event took place at the East Wintergarden in London in England from 19 March to 23 March. Nick Matthew won his third Canary Wharf Squash Classic trophy, beating James Willstrop in the final.

Prize money and ranking points
For 2012, the prize purse was $50,000. The prize money and points breakdown is as follows:

Seeds

Draw and results

Source:

See also
PSA World Tour 2012
Canary Wharf Squash Classic
2012 Men's British Open

References

External links
PSA Canary Wharf Squash Classic 2012 website
Canary Wharf Squash Classic 2012 official website

Canary Wharf Squash Classic
2012 in English sport
2012 sports events in London
Squash competitions in London